General elections were held in Guyana on 15 December 1997. The result was a victory for the People's Progressive Party, which won 29 of the 53 seats. Voter turnout was 88.4%.

Electoral system
The National Assembly had 65 members; 53 elected by proportional representation in a nationwide constituency, 10 appointed by the Regional Councils elected on the same date as the national members, and 2 appointed by the National Congress of Local Democratic Organs, an umbrella body representing the regional councils. These were the last elections to feature that electoral system, as the electoral law was amended in February 2001 ahead of the elections in March that year.

The President was elected by a first-past-the-post double simultaneous vote system, whereby each list nominated a presidential candidate and the presidential election itself was won by the candidate of the list having a plurality.

Results

References

Guyana
1997 in Guyana
Elections in Guyana